The Divisiones Regionales de Fútbol in the Community of Madrid, are organized by the Madrid Football Federation:
Categoría Preferente de Aficionados, 2 Groups of 18 teams (Level 6 of the Spanish football pyramid)
Primera Categoría de Aficionados, 4 Groups of 18 teams (Level 7)
Segunda Categoría de Aficionados, 8 Groups of 18 teams (Level 8)
Tercera Categoría de Aficionados, 16 Groups of 18 teams  (Level 9)

League chronology
Timeline

Categoría Preferente
 
Categoría Preferente is the sixth level of competition of the Spanish Football League in the Community of Madrid.

Competition System 

The league consists of two groups of 18 teams. At the end of the season the first two teams from each group are promoted to the Tercera División RFEF (Group 7). The last four of each group (15th, 16th, 17th and 18th) are relegated to Primera de Aficionados.

At this level, a reserve team and its parent can play at the same level in different groups. If the reserve team are in the promotion zone, the first team is promoted. If both teams are in the promotion zone, the third placed club within the group will be promoted. If the first team finishes in the relegation zone, the reserve team is demoted.

2022–23 teams

Group 1

Aravaca 
Complutense	
Concepción
Colmenar Viejo
Electrocor Las Rozas	
La Moraleja CF
Las Rozas CF B
Los Yébenes-San Bruno
ED Moratalaz
Periso CF
San Agustín
Rayo Alcobendas
Tres Cantos
Torrejón B
Unión Zona Norte
UD Sanse B
Villanueva del Pardillo
Vicálvaro

Group 2
Aluche
At. Pinto
Carabanchel
Ciudad de Getafe
Ciudad de los Ángeles
Colonia Moscardó
Lugo Fuenlabrada
Móstoles CF
El Álamo
Fortuna
Móstoles URJC B
Moratalaz B
Parla	
Parla Escuela
R. Madrid City
Rivas Vaciamadrid
Villaverde San Andrés
Villaviciosa Odón

Champions

Primera de Aficionados
 
Primera Categoría de Aficionados is the seventh level of competition in the Spanish league football in Madrid. 

The league consists of four groups of 18 teams. At the end of the season, the first two teams from each group are promoted to the Preferente. 

The last four classified in each group are relegated to the Segunda de Aficionados.

The first team and its reserve teams (maximum of three) can play on the same level in different groups. The first team is prompted whenever a reserve team is in the promotion zone. If the first team is in the relegation zone, the lowest reserve team is demoted.

2022–23 teams

Group 1
Alonso Cano
At. Leones de Castilla
DAV Santa Ana
Colmenar Viejo B	
Celtic Castilla
Cala Pozuelo
Cerceda CF	
Fom. Alumni	
Fundación	
Nuevo Boadilla
Recuerdo	
Recreativo Soto del Real
Siete Picos
Sp. Hortaleza B
Torrelodones
Unión Adarve B
Villanueva del Pardillo B
Villanueva de la Cañada

Group 2

Alcobendas CF
Avance
Alameda de Osuna
Canillas B	
Camarma
Coslada
E.D.F. Torres
Esperanza
Daganzo
San Fernando
Sporting Hortaleza
 San Agustín de Gua. B	
Juventud Sanse	
San Roque E.F.F	
Los Santos de la Humosa
Paracuellos Antamira B	
Henares Distrito IV
Racing Veracruz

Group 3
Alzola-Halcones
Arganda
Dep. Ciempozuelos
Ciudad de Pinto
EF Arganda
EF Valdemoro	
Elida Olimpia
Inter Valdemoro	
Roma CF
Mejoreño	
Orcasitas
Sitio de Aranjuez	
Santa María del Pilar
SD del Pozo
Tajamar
U. Valdebernardo
Usera
Villarejo

Group 4
Amistad Alcorcón-Olímpico
Atlético Socios
Atl. Navalcarnero
Atl. Trabenco 
Atl. Valdeiglesias
Fuenlabrada B
FEPE Getafe III	
EF Carabanchel
Campamento	
Griñón	
Humanes
UD Móstoles Balompié	
Lucero-Linces	
Los Yébenes-San Bruno B
Nuevo Puerta Bonita
Navalcarnero B
Móstoles CF B	
Robledo CF

Segunda de Aficionados
 
The Segunda de Aficionados is the eighth level of competition in the Spanish League Football in the Community of Madrid. It lies immediately below the Primera de Aficionados.

The league consists of 8 groups, each consisting of 18 teams. At the end of the season, the first 2 teams in each group promoted to the Primera de Aficionados. 

The last 2 teams of each group and the six worst 16th-placed teams are relegated to the Tercera de Aficionados.

The first team is promoted whenever a reserve team is in the promotion zone. The reserve team is demoted whenever the first team is in the relegation zone.

Some teams playing in this level
AD El Pardo

Tercera de Aficionados
 
The Tercera de Aficionados is the ninth level of competition in the Spanish League Football in the Community of Madrid. It lies immediately below the Segunda de Aficionados.

The league consists of 11 groups: one group of 17 teams and ten of 18. At the end of the season the first 2 teams in each group are promoted to the Segunda de Aficionados.

The first team is promoted whenever a reserve team is the promotion zone.

Some teams playing in this level
Fuencarral
Atl. Valdemoro

External links
Futmadrid.com
Federación de Fútbol de Madrid
Futbolme.com Comunidad de Madrid
acadef.es

Football in the Community of Madrid
Divisiones Regionales de Fútbol